Gallows Gallery is an album by the band Sigh. It was released by Candlelight Records originally in 2005.

Background
Gallows Gallery is Sigh's first album as a four-piece rather than a trio and their first album for which they made a music video. The album also more prominently features clean vocals, with Mirai's singing heavily processed through Pro Tools and vocoders. Sigh incorporated influences that prompted Avi Pitchon to describe the album in Terrorizer as containing a "decidedly power fuckin' metal vibe...it's power metal the Sigh way". Pitchon went on to suggest that "one thing Gallows Gallery surely isn't is black metal".

In response to suggestions that Gallows Gallery and the preceding Imaginary Sonicscape sounded more "happy" than previous Sigh albums, Mirai responded that:

Mirai also confirmed that, while the album is not a concept album, "musically each song is connected with the same or similar chord progressions and melodies", producing what he described as "a certain continuity".

The untitled Track 10 was purported to be a recording of sounds researched in sonic warfare, created to psychologically harm the listener. It was also rumored that the inclusion of this track was what caused the band to be dropped from the Century Media label; however, both of these rumors have been refuted by the band. These rumors were created in part to hide the poor mastering of the original release, and in part to hide the real reason why they were dropped from Century Media, which was that the label was disappointed that the band did not go in a more black metal-oriented direction.

In 2007, The End Records released a remastered reissue of the album, with revamped blue-sky artwork and extra tracks. The minute-long intro to "Confession to Be Buried" was removed from the remastered version, bringing the track's length down to 5:25.

The album was remastered again in 2012 by Blood Music, who released the album in limited double CD and double vinyl editions. The second disc contained previously unreleased demo recordings; additionally, the untitled tenth track and the David Harrow mix of "The Tranquilizer Song" were omitted from the remaster.

Track listing
All Songs Written by Sigh, except where noted.

2007 Reissue Bonus Tracks

 Pale Monument (Harsh Vocal Version) - 3:53
 In a Drowse (Demo 2003) - 3:41
 Messiahplan (Gunface Alternate Guitar Solo Take) - 3:48
 The Tranquilizer Song (David Harrow Remix Outtake) - 4:04
 Jazzy Outtake 1 - 0:32
 Jazzy Outtake 2 - 0:31

2012 Reissue Bonus Disc - Demos, September 20, 2004
 In a Drowse - 3:25
 Silver Universe - 3:49
 Confession to Be Buried - 4:00
 The Tranquilizer Song - 3:21
 The Enlightenment Day - 3:29
 Pale Monument - 3:52
 Gavotte Grim - 7:02
 Messiahplan - 3:49

Personnel

Sigh
Mirai Kawashima: Vocals, Organ, MiniMoog, Prophet-5 & DX-7 Synthesizers, Fender Rhodes, Clavinet, Sampling, Glockenspiel, Gong, Bells, Sitar, Tabla
Shinichi Ishikawa: Rhythm & Lead Guitars
Satoshi Fujinami: Bass, Additional Guitars
Junichi Harashima: Drums, Percussion, Brushes

Additional Personnel
Paul Groundwell, Gus G.: Additional Lead Guitars
Niklas Sundin - guitar solo on "In a Drowse"
Bruce Lamont (from jazz metal band Yakuza): Saxophone
Killjoy (from Necrophagia): Narration & Additional Vocals

References 

2005 albums
2007 albums
Sigh (band) albums